Plourin-lès-Morlaix (literally Plourin near Morlaix) is a commune in the Finistère department of Brittany in north-western France. It lies within the arrondissement of Morlaix.

Population
Inhabitants of Plourin-lès-Morlaix are called in French Plourinois.

Sights

The church 
The Notre Dame church dates back to the late 17th to early 18th century. The taxus tree next to the entrance is supposed to be one thousand years old.

See also
Communes of the Finistère department
Roland Doré sculptor
Plourin-lès-Morlaix Parish close

References

External links

Official website 

Mayors of Finistère Association 

Communes of Finistère